The Mexican National League was a professional baseball circuit that operated briefly in 1946. It was officially ranked as a Class B league in Organized Baseball and included six clubs that represented the cities of Mexico, Chihuahua, Ciudad Juárez, El Paso, Saltillo, and Torreón–Gómez Palacio.

But it was to be a short-lived experiment because of a strong competition from an independent Mexican League, created by a multi-millionaire Jorge Pasquel, who attempted to turn his baseball circuit into a first-rate rival to the Major Leagues, which forced the Class B regional league to fold.

As a result, the Mexico and Torreón-Gómez Palacio clubs disbanded in late April and the Mexican National League closed its operations on May 27. By then, the Ciudad Juárez and Chihuahua teams were tied in first place with an identical record of 23 wins and 21 losses.

List of teams
Chihuahua Dorados
El Paso Texans
Juarez Indios
Mexico City Aztecs
Saltillo Peroneros
Torreon-Gomez Palacio Laguneros

Sources
 Johnson, Lloyd; Wolff, Miles (1993). Encyclopedia of Minor League Baseball. Baseball America.

External links
Baseball Reference – Mexican National League (B) Encyclopedia and History

1946 establishments in Mexico
Defunct baseball leagues in Mexico